This is a list of the National Register of Historic Places listings in Taylor County, Texas.

This is intended to be a complete list of the properties and districts on the National Register of Historic Places in Taylor County, Texas. There are five districts and 55 individual properties along with three former properties listed on the National Register in the county. Among these are one State Antiquities Landmark, six Recorded Texas Historic Landmarks, plus an additional RTHL that is a contributing property to a historic district.

Current listings

The locations of National Register properties and districts may be seen in a mapping service provided.

|}

Former listing

|}

See also

National Register of Historic Places listings in Texas
Recorded Texas Historic Landmarks in Taylor County

References

External links

Registered Historic Places
Taylor County